Hearts of Oak is a 1924 American drama film based upon the play by James A. Herne and directed by John Ford. The film is considered to be lost.

Cast
 Hobart Bosworth as Terry Dunnivan
 Pauline Starke as Chrystal
 Theodore von Eltz as Ned Fairweather
 James Gordon as John Owen
 Francis Powers as Grandpa Dunnivan
 Jennie Lee as Grandma Dunnivan
 Francis Ford
 Frances Teague as Bridesmaid

See also
List of lost films
1937 Fox vault fire

References

External links

1924 films
1924 drama films
1924 lost films
American silent feature films
American black-and-white films
Silent American drama films
American films based on plays
Films directed by John Ford
Fox Film films
Lost American films
Lost drama films
1920s American films